106.3 Hope Radio (DYAM 106.3 MHz) is an FM station owned and operated by Adventist Media. Its studios and transmitter are located at Brgy. Luray II, Toledo, Cebu.

References

External links
Hope Radio Toledo FB Page
Hope Channel Cebu FB Page

Radio stations in Cebu
Radio stations established in 2019
Christian radio stations in the Philippines